The 1973 Houston Oilers season was their fourth season in the National Football League and their 14th in competition overall. The team matched their previous season’s output of 1–13, and they missed the playoffs for the fourth consecutive season. Their eighteen consecutive losses after winning the third game in 1972 was an NFL record beaten only by the expansion Tampa Bay Buccaneers in 1976 and 1977, the Detroit Lions from the last game of 2007 until the third game of 2009, and the Jacksonville Jaguars from 2020 to 2021.

Coach Bill Peterson left the team after an 0–5 start, and was replaced by coaching veteran Sid Gillman, who went 1–8 to finish the season. Peterson finished his NFL coaching career with a 1-18 record. The one win is the fewest for any head coach in NFL history. The Oilers’ offense struggled in 1973, ranking last in rushing yards (1388), second worst in yards per play (3.9), and third-worst in both total yards (3307) and first downs (tied at 193).

The 1973 Oilers had one of the worst defenses of all time, statistically; they gave up 447 points during the season, the most ever for a 14-game season in the merger era (1970–1977). Only three teams gave up more points in a 14-game season: the 1966 Giants, the 1963 Broncos, and the 1961 Raiders. Their point-differential of −248 points was the worst in the league that year, and remains one of the ten worst in NFL history. (The second-worst team, the Philadelphia Eagles, gave up 393 points, or 3.8 fewer points per game.) Houston also gave up a league-high 26 touchdown passes in 1973.

They are also the most recent franchise in the NFL to have back-to-back one-win seasons; in fact since 1974 not a single NFL franchise again suffered multiple one- or no-win seasons in a non-strike season, until the Cleveland Browns did so in 2016 and 2017. Since the NFL developed a uniform schedule in 1936, the only other time a franchise has had back-to-back one-win seasons has been the 1949 and 1950 Baltimore Colts.

Offseason

NFL draft

Roster

Schedule

Game summaries

Week 3

Standings

References

Houston Oilers seasons
Houston Oilers
Houston